Kakimoto (written: 柿本) is a Japanese surname. Notable people with the surname include:

, Japanese professional wrestler, mixed martial artist and model
, Japanese footballer
, Japanese footballer

Japanese-language surnames